The Sol Plaatje Local Municipality council consists of sixty-five members elected by mixed-member proportional representation. Thirty-three councillors are elected by first-past-the-post voting in thirty-three wards, while the remaining thirty-two are chosen from party lists so that the total number of party representatives is proportional to the number of votes received. In the election of 1 November 2021 the African National Congress (ANC) won a majority of thirty-three seats

Results 
The following table shows the composition of the council after past elections.

December 2000 election

The following table shows the results of the 2000 election.

March 2006 election

The following table shows the results of the 2006 election.

May 2011 election

The following table shows the results of the 2011 election.

August 2016 election

The following table shows the results of the 2016 election.

November 2021 election

The following table shows the results of the 2021 election.

By-elections from November 2021
The following by-elections were held to fill vacant ward seats in the period from November 2021. In ward 21, the DA candidate had their party membership terminated after switching to ActionSA, and in the by-election held on 31 August 2022, the DA candidate retained the seat for the party.

In ward 1, the ANC councillor died. In the resulting by-election, Ferguson Moses retained the seat for the party, which had taken the seat from the DA in 2021. The Patriotic Alliance gained significant support to finish in third place.

References

Sol Plaatje
Elections in the Northern Cape
elections